Mujir al-Din Baylaqani (also spelled Bailaqani; ; died 1197/98) was a Persian poet of the 12th-century. 

As implied by his nisba, Baylaqani was from Baylaqan, a town in Arran. During the 12th-century, Baylaqan served as a frontier between the sphere of influence of the Shirvanshahs, Georgians, Seljuks and Eldiguzids. During this period, the Caucasus region was inhabited by different ethnic groups, as demonstrated by Baylaqani's maternal side, which was Armenian.

References

Sources 
 
 
 
 
 
 

12th-century Iranian people
Year of birth unknown
1190s deaths

Year of death uncertain
Iranian people of Armenian descent
People from Beylagan District
12th-century Persian-language poets
Poets of the Shirvanshahs